A yellow pages is a telephone directory restricted to business entries.

Yellow Pages may also refer to:

of Directories
 Network Information Service 
 Yellow Pages (UDDI)
 Electronic Yellow Pages
 Yellow Pages Group, a Canadian directory publisher

Other uses
 Mr Yellow Pages, Loren M. Berry

See also 

 List of Yellow Pages
 
 
 Yellow Book (disambiguation)
 The Yellow Payges, 1960s rock band
 Yellow Pages Endeavour, sailboat
 Yellow (disambiguation)
 Page (disambiguation)